is the fourth studio album by American heavy metal band Trivium. The album was released worldwide on various dates between September 23, 2008, and October 1, 2008, through Roadrunner Records. It is their last release to feature original drummer Travis Smith. Work on the album is noted to have begun with producer Nick Raskulinecz in October 2007, with the band stating that they chose not to work with Jason Suecof again as they wanted to explore new ideas.

Background
In an interview with Metal Injection, Matt Heafy stated:

In an interview with Revolver, Corey Beaulieu stated:

Composition

Influences, style and themes

Shogun largely features a continuation of the band playing thrash metal, metalcore, and progressive metal, the latter exhibited by technical instrumentation and longer song lengths. It sees a prominent return of Matt Heafy's screaming vocals, which were a rare occurrence on The Crusade. The album is also the band's first album produced by Nick Raskulinecz. In an interview for About.com, Heafy described the album's musical direction as a combination of various aspects including: "the past, present, and future of Trivium, all on one CD" and that is the "next evolutionary step". When asked about the change in his singing style, he said: "It's the kind of thing that happened naturally." Shogun heavily features 7-string guitars and 5-string bass guitars, which had been used sparingly on The Crusade.

The group did not want to make an album where all songs had the same singing style, like in The Crusade, and decided to just let their music flow naturally and unbiased. Unlike The Crusade, which had some songs focusing on famous and controversial murders/crimes, this album has a few songs that deal with ancient Japanese military customs and several regarding Greek mythology, some serving as metaphors to be interpreted by the listener. "Into the Mouth of Hell We March" and "Torn Between Scylla and Charybdis" detail the story of Odysseus choosing whether to face the giant whirlpool Charybdis or the 6-headed monster Scylla. "He Who Spawned the Furies" is about the Titan Cronus devouring his children and castrating his father Uranus, creating Aphrodite and the Erinýes (the Furies). "Of Prometheus and the Crucifix" references the daily torment of Prometheus and alludes to crucifixion of Jesus Christ, serving as a metaphor for enduring torment by the public for daring to contribute something new to society. "Like Callisto to a Star in Heaven" is written from the perspective of the nymph Callisto, detailing her rape and impregnation by Zeus and her transformations into a bear and into Ursa Major. "Down from the Sky" features a contemporary theme, chastising those who spark wars for profit or religion, and warning of nuclear holocaust.

With a duration of over 11 minutes, the album's title track is the longest Trivium have ever recorded.

Release and promotion
On June 16, 2008, Trivium posted a bulletin on their MySpace profile titled "New Album Update" with an embedded YouTube video, implying that the album would be released on September 30, 2008, by Roadrunner. On July 31, the first track from the new album, "Kirisute Gomen", was made available as a free digital download through the Roadrunner Records website for 24 hours only. On August 8, the cover art for the album was revealed. On August 12, the fourth track from the new album, "Into the Mouth of Hell We March", was made available for purchase on iTunes. On September 1, the third track and first single from the album "Down from the Sky" was made available for purchase on iTunes, as well as in stores. On September 2, the music video for "Down from the Sky" was released (exclusively) on MySpace. The band would later upload "Throes of Perdition" to their MySpace page on September 17 and on September 23 the complete album was added.

Critical reception

The album received mostly positive reviews, with Chad Bowar of About.com praising the band's progress on songwriting, as well as their musicianship. Bowar finishing its review stating: "Shogun won't silence Trivium's legions of critics, but I think most fans will like the harsh vocals along with the great riffs and memorable melodies." Eduardo Rivadavia of AllMusic described Shogun as "Trivium's most challenging and ambitious album yet." IGN's Ed Thompson wrote that with the release of their fourth full-length album the "band have done what absolutely needed to be done." The band's ideas and influences were praised by Thompson, and considered Shogun the best of their first four albums. Thompson also defined Shogun as the band's "best effort to date."

Commercial performance
Since its release, Shogun has sold over 300,000 copies worldwide. In the United States in its first week of release sold 24,000 copies and debuted at number 23 on the Billboard 200 chart, and the top 100 in 18 other countries, including number 6 on the Japanese international charts, number 4 on the Canadian Hard Rock Charts, number 1 on the UK rock charts and number 4 on the Australian charts.
As of March 2009, the album has sold around 70,000 copies in the United States since its late September release, according to Nielsen SoundScan.

Track listing

Special edition DVD
 The Making of Shogun (A behind-the-scenes documentary capturing the making of the album)
 Shogun: The Riffs (Instructional videos for guitar and bass)

Notes
 "Into the Mouth of Hell We March" was featured on the soundtrack for the 2008 video game Madden NFL 09.
 "Down from the Sky" was featured on the WWE SmackDown! Vs Raw 2010 soundtrack.
 In the special edition of the album, the song "Shogun" fades out earlier, making it a length of 11:22.

Personnel
Trivium
Matt Heafy – lead vocals, guitars
Corey Beaulieu – guitars, unclean backing vocals
Paolo Gregoletto – bass, clean backing vocals
Travis Smith – drums, percussion

Production
 Nick Raskulinecz – producer
 Paul Fig – engineer
 Nick Raskulinecz – engineer
 Ben Terry – engineer
 Colin Richardson – mixing (1–11)
 Jeffrey Rose – mixing (12–14), mixing engineer
 Martin "Ginge" Ford – mixing engineer
 Matt Wiggins – assistant engineer
 Mark Lewis – pre-production engineer
 Ted Jensen – mastering

Charts

References

External links

2008 albums
Trivium (band) albums
Roadrunner Records albums
Albums produced by Nick Raskulinecz